Fahim Fazli (born May 30, 1966) is an Afghan American film actor.

Biography
Fazli was born in Kabul, Afghanistan. He escaped Afghanistan and settled in the United States in the 1980s. He returned to Afghanistan as an interpreter with the U.S. Marines in 2009 and 2010. After returning, he wrote a memoir, Fahim Speaks that was released in early 2012.

Filmography

Film

Television

Video games

References

External links

1966 births
Living people
American male film actors
American people of Afghan descent
People from Kabul
Afghan male film actors